Coleophora phoenicia is a moth of the family Coleophoridae.

References

phoenicia
Moths described in 1994